Robert Terwilliger may refer to:

 Sideshow Bob (Robert Underdunk Terwilliger), a recurring character in the animated television series The Simpsons
 Robert Terwilliger (bishop) (1917–1991), suffragan bishop of the Episcopal Diocese of Dallas